Lampetis orientalis is a jewel beetle of the family Buprestidae.

Description
Head and pronotum are bronzed-cupreous. Elytra are brownish-black. Pronotum is finely punctured on disk.

Distribution
This species is widespread over all the Indian subcontinent.

References

Buprestidae
Woodboring beetles
Beetles described in 1837